Hampton City Schools is the school division of Hampton, Virginia.

Administration

Superintendent 
The superintendent of Hampton City Schools is Jeffrey Smith. Before his appointment in July 2015, Smith was the superintendent of West Point Public Schools.

School Board 
There are 7 members on the school board and 2 student representatives

 Joe C. Kilgore, Chair
 Reginald Woodhouse, Vice Chair
 Stephanie Jackson Afonja
 Tina Banks-Gray
 Ann Cherry
 Richard Mason
 Jason Samuels
 Muhammed Al Saffar, Student Representative
 Tamia Kelly, Student Representative

Schools

High schools
 Bethel High School
 Hampton High School
 Kecoughtan High School
 Phoebus High School
 Bridgeport Academy

K-8 schools
 Andrews PreK-8
 Phenix PreK-8
 Kilgore Gifted Center

Middle schools
 Eaton Middle School
 Jones Middle School
 Lindsay Middle School
 Syms Middle School
 Tarrant Middle School

Elementary schools
 Aberdeen Elementary School
 Armstrong Elementary School
 Asbury Elementary School
 Barron Elementary School
 Bassette Elementary School
 Bryan Elementary School
 Burbank Elementary School
 Christian Elementary School
 Cooper Elementary School
 Forrest Elementary School
 Jackson Elementary School
 Kraft Elementary School
 Langley Elementary School
 Machen Elementary School
 Patrick Elementary School
 Peake Elementary School
 Phillips Elementary School
 Smith Elementary School

Pre-Kindergarten
 Robert R. Moton Early Childhood Center

References

External links
 Hampton City Schools

Education in Hampton, Virginia
School divisions in Virginia